The following outline is provided as an overview of and topical guide to Chile:

Chile – country in South America occupying a long, narrow strip of land between the Andes mountains to the east and the Pacific Ocean to the west. Prior to the arrival of the Spanish in the 16th century, northern and central Chile was under Inca rule while independent Mapuche inhabited south-central Chile. Chile declared its independence from Spain on 12 February 1818. Today Chile is one of South America's most stable and prosperous nations, a recognized middle power, and an emerging economy.

General reference 
 Pronunciation: ; 
 Common English country name: Chile
 Official English country name:  The Republic of Chile
 Ethnic structure of Chile: 60% White 39% Mestizo 1% Indigenous
 Common endonym(s): Chile
 Official endonym(s): República de Chile
 Adjectival(s): Chilean
 Demonym(s): Chilean
 Etymology: Name of Chile
 International rankings of Chile
 ISO country codes: CL, CHL, 152
 ISO region codes: See ISO 3166-2:CL
 Internet country code top-level domain: .cl

Geography of Chile 

Geography of Chile
 Chile is: a country
 Location:
 Southern Hemisphere
 Western Hemisphere
 Latin America
 South America
 Southern Cone
 Time zones:
 Easter Island – UTC-06, October–March UTC-05
 Rest of Chile (Except Magallanes Region)– UTC-04, October–March UTC-03
 Magallanes Region - UTC-03
 Extreme points of Chile
 High:  Ojos del Salado 
 Low:  South Pacific Ocean 0 m
 North: tripartite border with Bolivia and Peru
 Southernmost point can be either:
 Mainland: Águila Islet, Diego Ramírez Islands
 Including Antártica: The South Pole
 Westernmost point: Motu Nui, off Easter Island
 Easternmost point can be either:
 Mainland: Nueva Island
 Including Antártica: the 53rd meridian west over Antarctica
 Land boundaries: 
 
 
 
 Coastline:  
 Population of Chile: 16,763,470 (2008) - 60th most populous country
 Area of Chile:  - 38th largest country
 Atlas of Chile

Environment of Chile 

 Climate of Chile
 Environmental issues in Chile
 Ecoregions in Chile
 Renewable energy in Chile
 Geology of Chile
 Earthquakes in Chile
 Volcanism of Chile
 Protected areas of Chile
 Biosphere reserves in Chile
 National parks of Chile
 Wildlife of Chile
 Flora of Chile
 Fauna of Chile
 Birds of Chile
 Mammals of Chile

Natural geographic features of Chile 

 Glaciers of Chile
 Islands of Chile
 Lakes of Chile
 Mountains of Chile
 Volcanoes in Chile
 Rivers of Chile
 World Heritage Sites in Chile

Regions of Chile

Ecoregions of Chile 

List of ecoregions in Chile

Administrative divisions of Chile 

Administrative divisions of Chile
 Regions of Chile
 Provinces of Chile
 Communes of Chile

Cities of Chile 

List of cities in Chile
 Capital of Chile: Santiago

Demography of Chile 

Demographics of Chile

Government and politics of Chile 

Politics of Chile
 Form of government: presidential representative democratic republic
 Capital of Chile: Santiago
 Elections in Chile
 Political parties in Chile
 Political scandals in Chile

Branches of government 

Government of Chile

Executive branch of the government of Chile 
 Head of state: President of Chile, Gabriel Boric (2022-)
 Head of government: President of Chile, Gabriel Boric (2022-)
 Cabinet of Chile

Legislative branch of the government of Chile 

 National Congress of Chile (bicameral)
 Upper house: Senate of Chile
 Lower house: Chamber of Deputies of Chile

Judicial branch of the government of Chile 

Court system of Chile
 Supreme Court of Chile

Foreign relations of Chile 

Foreign relations of Chile
 List of diplomatic missions in Chile
 List of diplomatic missions of Chile

International organization membership 
The Republic of Chile is a member of:

Agency for the Prohibition of Nuclear Weapons in Latin America and the Caribbean (OPANAL)
Andean Community of Nations (CAN) (associate)
Asia-Pacific Economic Cooperation (APEC)
Bank for International Settlements (BIS)
Central American Integration System (SICA) (observer)
Food and Agriculture Organization (FAO)
Group of 15 (G15)
Group of 77 (G77)
Inter-American Development Bank (IADB)
International Atomic Energy Agency (IAEA)
International Bank for Reconstruction and Development (IBRD)
International Chamber of Commerce (ICC)
International Civil Aviation Organization (ICAO)
International Criminal Court (ICCt) (signatory)
International Criminal Police Organization (Interpol)
International Development Association (IDA)
International Federation of Red Cross and Red Crescent Societies (IFRCS)
International Finance Corporation (IFC)
International Fund for Agricultural Development (IFAD)
International Hydrographic Organization (IHO)
International Labour Organization (ILO)
International Maritime Organization (IMO)
International Mobile Satellite Organization (IMSO)
International Monetary Fund (IMF)
International Olympic Committee (IOC)
International Organization for Migration (IOM)
International Organization for Standardization (ISO)
International Red Cross and Red Crescent Movement (ICRM)
International Telecommunication Union (ITU)
International Telecommunications Satellite Organization (ITSO)
International Trade Union Confederation (ITUC)

Inter-Parliamentary Union (IPU)
Latin American Economic System (LAES)
Latin American Integration Association (LAIA)
Multilateral Investment Guarantee Agency (MIGA)
Nonaligned Movement (NAM)
Organisation for Economic Co-operation and Development (OECD) (accession state)
Organisation for the Prohibition of Chemical Weapons (OPCW)
Organization of American States (OAS)
Permanent Court of Arbitration (PCA)
Rio Group (RG)
Southern Cone Common Market (Mercosur) (associate)
Unión Latina
Union of South American Nations (UNASUR)
United Nations (UN)
United Nations Conference on Trade and Development (UNCTAD)
United Nations Educational, Scientific, and Cultural Organization (UNESCO)
United Nations High Commissioner for Refugees (UNHCR)
United Nations Industrial Development Organization (UNIDO)
United Nations Military Observer Group in India and Pakistan (UNMOGIP)
United Nations Stabilization Mission in Haiti (MINUSTAH)
United Nations Truce Supervision Organization (UNTSO)
Universal Postal Union (UPU)
World Confederation of Labour (WCL)
World Customs Organization (WCO)
World Federation of Trade Unions (WFTU)
World Health Organization (WHO)
World Intellectual Property Organization (WIPO)
World Meteorological Organization (WMO)
World Tourism Organization (UNWTO)
World Trade Organization (WTO)

Law and order in Chile 

Law of Chile
 Cannabis in Chile
 Constitution of Chile
 Crime in Chile
 Human rights in Chile
 LGBT rights in Chile
 Freedom of religion in Chile
 Law enforcement in Chile

Military of Chile 

Military of Chile
 Command
 Commander-in-chief:
 Ministry of Defence of Chile
 Forces
 Army of Chile
 Navy of Chile
 Air Force of Chile
 Lautaro Special Operations Brigade

Local government in Chile 

Local government in Chile

History of Chile 

History of Chile
Timeline of the history of Chile
Current events of Chile

Culture of Chile 

Culture of Chile
 Architecture of Chile
 Cuisine of Chile
 Languages of Chile
 National symbols of Chile
 Coat of arms of Chile
 Flag of Chile
 National anthem of Chile
 People of Chile
 Prostitution in Chile
 Public holidays in Chile
 Religion in Chile
 Christianity in Chile
 Hinduism in Chile
 Islam in Chile
 Judaism in Chile
 World Heritage Sites in Chile

Media in Chile 
 Art in Chile
 Museums in Chile
 Cinema of Chile
 Literature of Chile
 Music of Chile
 Newspapers in Chile
 Television in Chile
 Theatre in Chile
 Municipal Theatre of Santiago
 Ictus Theatre

Sports in Chile 

 Football in Chile
 Chile at the Olympics

Economy and infrastructure of Chile 

Economy of Chile
 Economic rank, by nominal GDP (2007): 43rd (forty-third)
 Agriculture in Chile
 Banking in Chile
 Central Bank of Chile
 Communications in Chile
 Internet in Chile
 Companies of Chile
Currency of Chile: Peso
ISO 4217: CLP
 Energy in Chile
 Health care in Chile
 Mining in Chile
 Ministry of Finance
 Santiago Stock Exchange
 Tourism in Chile
 Transport in Chile
 Airports in Chile
 Rail transport in Chile
 Water supply and sanitation in Chile

Education in Chile 

Education in Chile
 Chilean Traditional Universities

See also 

Chile

Index of Chile-related articles
List of Chile-related topics
List of international rankings
Member state of the United Nations
Outline of geography
Outline of South America

References

External links 

 Official resources
 Gobierno - Government (English version)
 Ministerio del Interior - Interior Ministry
 Ministerio de Relaciones Exteriores - Ministry of Foreign Affairs
 Ministerio de Hacienda - Ministry of Finance (English version)
 Congreso Nacional - National Congress
 Senado - Senate
 Cámara de Diputados - Chamber of Deputies
 Biblioteca del Congreso Nacional - Library of National Congress
 Poder Judicial - Judiciary
 Banco Central - Central Bank (English version)
 Instituto Nacional de Estadísticas (INE) - National Statistics Institute

 General information
 Atacama, Chile Web Site
 Atacama Chile

 
 Several links compiled by LANIC
 Council of Hemispheric Affairs An independent source of Latin American News and Opinion
Congressional Research Service (CRS) Reports regarding Chile
 Invest in Chile
 Native flora species
 Chile travel ideas

 
 
Chile